The white-throated jungle flycatcher (Vauriella albigularis), also known as the Negros jungle flycatcher is a species of bird in the Old World flycatcher family Muscicapidae.
It is endemic to the Philippines (Negros and Panay islands) and formerly on Guimaras before its extirpation there. The natural habitats of the white-throated jungle flycatcher are tropical moist lowland forests and tropical moist montane forests up to 1,350 masl. It is threatened by habitat loss.

This species was previously placed in the genus Rhinomyias but was moved to Vauriella after a detailed molecular phylogenetic study published in 2010 found that Rhinomyias was polyphyletic.

Description 

EBird describes the bird as "A fairly small bird. Rufous-brown on the wings, back, and tail, with a gray head, heavily-streaked pale underparts, and a black face and moustache stripe. Often found in mixed-species flocks. Somewhat similar to Stripe-headed rhabdornis and Grand rhabdornis, but smaller, with a white eye-ring rather than a black band through the eye. Voice includes a loud rattling trill and various quiet chips and squeals."

Habitat and Conservation Status 
It is found in tropical moist lowland forests and the lower reaches of tropical moist montane forests typically below 1,000 meters above sea level with it being recorded at a maximum of 1,350 meters above sea level. It prefers primary forest but it has also been recorded in secondary forest and forest edge. It forages in the understorey and lower canopy usually below 10 meters above the ground.

The IUCN Red List assessed this bird as endangered with population is estimated to be 2,500 to 9,999 mature individuals. It is mainly threatened by habitat loss. Negros is one of the most deforested islands in the country owing to illegal logging and conversion of forests into sugarcane plantations. An estimated 4% of Negros and 8% of Panay remained forested in 1988, most of it above 1,000 m.

Conservation actions proposed include more surveys, especially on Panay are suggested to fully understand the range and population of this bird. Seek to obtain stronger protection of remaining forest areas including securing funding to increase the number of forest rangers, as well as strengthening enforcement measures to prevent illegal logging.

References

External links
BirdLife Species Factsheet.

white-throated jungle flycatcher
Birds of Negros Island
Birds of Panay
white-throated jungle flycatcher
white-throated jungle flycatcher
white-throated jungle flycatcher
Taxonomy articles created by Polbot